The 2014–15 ECHL season was the 27th season of the ECHL. The regular season schedule ran from October 17, 2014, to April 11, 2015, with the Kelly Cup playoffs following. Twenty-eight teams in 20 states and one Canadian province each played a 72-game schedule. Ten days prior to the start of the season, the league was significantly expanded on October 7, 2014, after the ECHL had accepted the Central Hockey League's remaining seven teams as members for the 2014–15 season.

League business

Team changes 
 The expansion Indy Fuel began play at the Fairgrounds Coliseum in Indianapolis, Indiana.
 The Las Vegas Wranglers voluntarily suspended operations in May 2014 to allow the team time to secure a new home arena. The team's lease with the Orleans Arena in Las Vegas was not renewed after the 2013–14 season. In January 2015, the team announced that they would not be returning and had withdrawn their membership from the ECHL at the Mid-season Board of Governors Meeting.
 Shortly before the season began on October 17, 2014, the ECHL expanded with seven new teams as a result of accepting the Central Hockey League's remaining seven teams as members. The Allen Americans, Brampton Beast, Missouri Mavericks, Quad City Mallards, Rapid City Rush, Tulsa Oilers and Wichita Thunder formed a new Central Division in the Western Conference. This entirely replaced a previously planned Midwest Division, which in turn reassigned the Colorado Eagles to the Western Conference's Pacific Division and sent Evansville, Fort Wayne, Kalamazoo and Indy to the Eastern Conference's North Division. Within the Eastern Conference the Elmira Jackals and Reading Royals were reassigned to the former South Division, which was renamed the East Division.

New affiliations and changes

Annual Board of Governors meeting

The annual ECHL Board of Governors meeting was held at the Monte Carlo Resort and Casino in Las Vegas, Nevada, in June 2014. Conferences were significantly re-aligned in light of recent team changes. In the Eastern Conference, the three-team Atlantic Division was eliminated while the Mountain Division in the Western Conference was eliminated to make way for a new Midwest Division. The Evansville IceMen, Fort Wayne Komets and Kalamazoo Wings were moved to the Western Conference to compete in the Midwest Division with the Colorado Eagles and expansion Indy Fuel. This was significantly revised after the CHL merger in October 2014, with the newly created Midwest Division eliminated in favor of a Central Division consisting of the former CHL teams. Along with Indy, Evansville, Fort Wayne and Kalamazoo were moved back to the Eastern Conference.

The ECHL Board of Governors also re-elected Gwinnett Gladiators president Steve Chapman as chairman and approved changes to the icing rule similar to those previously implemented by the National Hockey League.

All-star game 

The annual ECHL All-Star Classic was held on January 21, 2015, at the Amway Center in Orlando, Florida. The format for the 2015 All-star Game featured the Orlando Solar Bears taking on the ECHL All-stars. The ECHL All-stars won the game with a score of 8-4 and the game had the largest ECHL all-star game attendance since 2000.

2015 Kelly Cup Playoffs format

At the end of the regular season the top four teams in each division qualified for the 2015 Kelly Cup Playoffs. The first two playoff rounds were played entirely within the divisions, with the divisional playoff champions facing each other in the conference championships. The Kelly Cup final pitted the Eastern Conference champion against the Western Conference champion.  All four rounds were a best-of-seven format.

Standings
Due to accepting the Central Hockey League's remaining seven teams as members, the league's conference alignment changed on October 9, 2014, moving the Colorado Eagles to the Pacific Division and moving the seven former CHL squads into the Western Conference as the Central Division. The Midwest Division dissolved, with its remaining teams joining the North Division. To make room for the four Midwest teams, the Reading Royals and Elmira Jackals left the North Division for the South, which was then renamed the East Division.

Final Regular Season Standings
Eastern Conference

Western Conference

 - clinched playoff spot,  - clinched regular season division title,  - Brabham Cup (regular season) champion

Postseason

Awards

All-ECHL Teams
All-First Team
Jeff Jakaitis (G) – South Carolina Stingrays
Mike Little (D) – Florida Everblades
Matthew Register (D) – Ontario Reign
Chad Costello (F) – Allen Americans
Wade MacLeod (F) – Idaho Steelheads
Shawn Szydlowski (F) – Fort Wayne Komets

All-Second Team
Jeff Lerg (G) – Toledo Walleye
Cameron Burt (D) – Florida Everblades
Aaron Gens (D) – Allen Americans
Adam Brace (F) – Florida Everblades
Brendan Connolly (F) – Alaska Aces
Gary Steffes (F) – Allen Americans

All-Rookie Team
Roman Will (G) – Fort Wayne Komets
Justin Baker (D) – Allen Americans
Steven Shamanski (D) – Elmira Jackals
Derek Army (F) – Wheeling Nailers
Tyler Barnes (F) – Toledo Walleye
Jason Bast (F) – Idaho Steelheads

References

See also 
2014 in sports
2015 in sports

 
2014-15
3
3